Zalat Taung is an island off the coast of Rakhine State, Burma.

Geography
It has a small settlement by its north-facing cove.

Zalat Taung is located at the mouth of the Sandoway (Thandwe) river.

See also
List of islands of Burma

References

External links
Zalat Taung - Geographic.org

Islands of Myanmar
Rakhine State
Mud volcanoes